Jainoor is a census town in Komaram Bheem district of the Indian state of Telangana.

It is a tribal area and the cotton cultivation is main livelihood for many people in this area.

References 

Villages in Komaram Bheem district
Mandals in Komaram Bheem district